Aliabad-e Ayvora (also Romanized as ‘Alīābād-e Ayvorā; also known as ‘Alīābād) is a village in Chaharduli Rural District, in the Central District of Asadabad County, Hamadan Province, Iran. At the 2006 census, its population was 354, in 73 families.

References 

Populated places in Asadabad County